The three Rogers brothers were World War II sailors who, while serving together aboard the , were all killed in action during the Battle of Tassafaronga on November 30, 1942.  Their younger brother Hugh, who was 17 at the time of their deaths, enlisted in the Navy and served aboard the USS New Orleans.  The U.S. Navy destroyer  was named in their memory.

They were:

 Edward Keith Rogers, 30, Seaman First Class
 Jack Ellis Rogers Jr., 22, Seaman First Class
 Charles Ethbert Rogers, 20, Seaman First Class

Similar to the Sullivan brothers' deaths aboard the  roughly two weeks earlier, events such as these led to the adoption of a rule that no longer permitted family members to serve with each other in combat areas.

References

1942 deaths
20th-century births
United States Navy personnel killed in World War II
United States Navy sailors
Sibling groups